FC Kolomna is a Russian football team from Kolomna. It was founded in 1906, from a merger of two Kolomna teams, FC Oka and FC Avangard-Kortek. They played professionally from 1997 to 2002, and again beginning in the 2013–14 season. Their best result was 2nd place in the Center Zone of the Russian Third League in 1999. In 1997, there were two clubs called FC Kolomna, one competed in the Russian Third League and another in the Amateur Football League.

Current squad
As of 22 February 2023, according to the Second League website.

Notable players
Had international caps for their respective countries. Players whose name is listed in bold represented their countries while playing for Kolomna.

Russia/USSR
 Eduard Malofeyev
Former USSR countries
 Umed Alidodov
 Alier Ashurmamadov
 Evgeniy Liferov

 Sergey Piskaryov
 Akhmed Yengurazov
 Aleksey Kozlov

External links
  Official site
  Team history at Footballfacts

Association football clubs established in 1906
Football clubs in Russia
Football in Moscow Oblast
Sport in Kolomna
1906 establishments in the Russian Empire